Once Upon a Time in the East: The Early Years 1981–1982 is a compilation album from the 1980s British band The Farmer's Boys.

Track listing
 "I Lack Concentration"
 "Or What"
 "Squit"
 "Autumn"
 "I Don't Know Why I Don't Like All My Friends"
 "I Think I Need Help" (early recording)
 "Squittest" (early recording)
 "Muck It Out" (flexi disc version)
 "Spring"^
 "Funny Old Mr. Baz (Whatever Is He Like?)"^
 "With These Hands I Built the World"†
 "Description of the River Wavney at Wortwell"†
 "Soft Drink"†
 "Drinking and Dressing Up"†
 "The Country Line"†
 "Funky Combine John"^
 "T.O.S.D."^
 "More Than a Dream"^
 "Homo Kino"

† Peel Session recordings

^ Recorded for The David Jensen Show

2003 compilation albums
The Farmer's Boys albums